Kuleh Kesh (also Romanized as Kūleh Kesh; also known as Kūl Kesh) is a village in Rostamabad-e Shomali Rural District, in the Central District of Rudbar County, Gilan Province, Iran. At the 2006 census, its population was 78, in 24 families.

References 

Populated places in Rudbar County